Kařízek is a municipality and village in Rokycany District in the Plzeň Region of the Czech Republic. It has about 50 inhabitants.

Transport
Kařížek is served by a station on a regional railway line leading from Plzeň to Beroun. However, this station is located just beyond the municipal border.

References

Villages in Rokycany District